Fritz Gschweidl (13 December 1901 – 5 April 1970) was an Austrian footballer and coach. He played mainly as an inside right and was noted for his technical ability and unselfish style of play.

References

1901 births
1970 deaths
Austrian footballers
Association football forwards
Austria international footballers
Austrian football managers
First Vienna FC players
Footballers from Vienna
First Vienna FC managers